The Barrow Rangers GAA is a Gaelic Athletic Association club in County Kilkenny, Ireland. It was founded in 1906 and is affiliated to Kilkenny GAA. The club is based in the areas of Paulstown and Gorebridge, in the east of the county. The club is almost exclusively concerned with the game of hurling, but has some history in football. In hurling, it competes in the Kilkenny Junior Hurling Championship.

Barrow Rangers have won the Kilkenny Junior Hurling Championship three times in 1982, 1988 and 1990. The club also won the Kilkenny Senior Football Championship in 1935.
And also winning the Kilkenny Junior Football Championship in 2022.

History
Founded in 1906.

Hurling

Honours
 Kilkenny Junior Hurling Championship (3)
 1982, 1988, 1990

Football

Honours
 Kilkenny Senior Football Championship (1)
 1965
Kilkenny Junior Football Championship (1) 2022

Notable players
 Richie Doyle

See also
 List of Gaelic games clubs in Ireland
 Kilkenny Junior Hurling Championship
 Kilkenny Senior Football Championship

References

External links
 [ Barrow Rangers GAA website]
 

Gaelic games clubs in County Kilkenny
Hurling clubs in County Kilkenny